AntiStar is an album by Marshmallow Coast and their 5th album in total.

Track listing

Personnel 
Sara Kirkpatrick – flute, vocals
Andy Gonzales – guitar, bass, keyboard

Jason Nesmith – percussion, human beatbox, banjo, keyboards, effects, glockenspiel, sampler
Eric Harris – Drums
Derek Dibono – Bongos, Congas

Production 
Jason Nesmith – engineer, mixed by, mastered

References

2003 albums
Marshmallow Coast albums